Philip Duval  (also Du Val, 1732 – 14 March 1808) was a Canon of Windsor from 1772 to 1808. He was chaplain to the Duke of Gloucester.

Duval was the son of the French-born Dr. Philippe Duval, physician to the Augusta of Saxe-Gotha, Princess of Wales, the mother of George III. His mother was Marianne Aufrère of Burnside and Foulsham Old Hall, descended from Huguenot nobility.

Career
He was educated at Westminster School and Trinity College, Cambridge and was awarded LLB in 1750 and DD in 1756.

He was appointed:
Prebendary of Worcester Cathedral 1767-1772
Rector of Broodwas, Worcestershire 1768
Preceptor to the Dukes of Cumberland and Gloucester
Chaplain and Treasurer to the Duke of Gloucester
Rector of Hartley Westpall 1786
Rector of Isleworth 1792
Vicar of Twickenham 1792-1808

He was appointed to the ninth stall in St George's Chapel, Windsor Castle in 1772, a position he held until 1808.

He married Anna George, daughter of Dr William George, Provost of King's College, Cambridge.

Notes 

1732 births
1808 deaths
Canons of Windsor
Alumni of Trinity College, Cambridge
Fellows of the Royal Society
Fellows of the Society of Antiquaries of London